The Oldknows Factory is a former lace factory on St Ann's Hill Road, in the city of Nottingham in England.

The factory is formed of two 18th century factories, which have since been joined. The original purpose of both factories was the manufacture of lace. It's since been converted to house artist studios, workshops, and offices. The original structure remains as a Grade II-listed building.

References

External links
Official website of the Oldknows Factory

Buildings and structures in Nottingham
Grade II listed buildings in Nottinghamshire